The 2020 Internationaux de France was scheduled to be the fourth event in the 2020–21 ISU Grand Prix of Figure Skating, a senior-level international invitational competition series. It would have been held at Patinoire Polesud in Grenoble, France on November 13–15. Medals were to be awarded in the disciplines of men's singles, ladies' singles, pair skating, and ice dance.

Due to the ongoing COVID-19 pandemic, a large number of modifications were made to the Grand Prix structure. The competitors consisted only of skaters from the home country, skaters already training in the host nation, and skaters assigned to that event for geographic reasons.

On October 19, the French Federation of Ice Sports and the ISU announced the cancellation of the event.

Entries 
The International Skating Union announced the preliminary assignments on October 1, 2020.

Changes to preliminary assignments

References 

2020 Internationaux de France
2020 in figure skating
2020 in French sport
November 2020 sports events in France
Sports competitions in Grenoble
Figure skating events cancelled due to the COVID-19 pandemic